André-Aimé-René Masson (4 January 1896 – 28 October 1987) was a French artist.

Biography

Masson was born in Balagny-sur-Thérain, Oise, but when he was eight his father's work took the family first briefly to Lille and then to Brussels. He began his study of art at the age of eleven at the Académie Royale des Beaux-Arts in Brussels, under the guidance of Constant Montald, and later he studied in Paris. He fought for France during World War I and was seriously injured.

Artistic works
His early works display an interest in cubism. He later became associated with surrealism, and he was one of the most enthusiastic employers of automatic drawing, making a number of automatic works in pen and ink. Masson experimented with altered states of consciousness with artists such as Antonin Artaud, Michel Leiris, Joan Miró, Georges Bataille, Jean Dubuffet and Georges Malkine, who were neighbors of his studio in Paris.

From around 1926 he experimented by throwing sand and glue onto canvas and making oil paintings based around the shapes that formed. By the end of the 1920s, however, he was finding automatic drawing rather restricting, and he left the surrealist movement and turned instead to a more structured style, often producing works with a violent or erotic theme. He was living in Tossa de Mar, a small fishing village on the Costa Brava, at the outbreak of the Spanish Civil War, which is reflected in a number of his paintings (he associated once more with the surrealists at the end of the 1930s).<ref>The Making of an Englishman, Fred Uhlman, Victor Gollanz, 1960, p.188.</ref>

Under the German occupation of France during World War II, his work was condemned by the Nazis as degenerate. With the assistance of Varian Fry in Marseille, Masson escaped the Nazi regime on a ship to the French island of Martinique from where he went on to the United States. Upon arrival in New York City customs officials inspecting Masson's luggage found a cache of his erotic drawings. Living in New Preston, Connecticut his work became an important influence on American abstract expressionists, such as Jackson Pollock. Following the war, he returned to France and settled in Aix-en-Provence where he painted a number of landscapes.

Masson drew the cover of the first issue of Georges Bataille's review, Acéphale, in 1936, and participated in all its issues until 1939. His brother-in-law, the psychoanalyst Jacques Lacan, was the last private owner of Gustave Courbet's provocative painting L'Origine du monde  (The Origin of the World); Lacan asked Masson to paint a surrealist variant.

Family

His son, Diego Masson (born 1935), is a conductor, composer, and percussionist, while another son, Luis Masson, is an actor. His daughter, Lily Masson (1920-2019), was a painter.

 Bibliography 
 Hélène Parant, Fabrice Flahutez, and Camille Morando. La bibliothèque d'André Masson. Une archéologie. Paris: Artvenir, 2011. .
 André Masson. Catalogue raisonné de l'œuvre peint, 1919–1941. Vaumarcus: Éditions ArtAcatos, 2010. Catalog by Guite Masson, Martin Masson, and Catherine Loewer, preface by Bernard Noël, "André Masson" de Dawn Adès, Biographie d'André Masson (1896–1941) by Camille Morando.
 André Masson. Published on the initiative of Robert Desnos and Armand Salacrou in 1940 (limited edition by an anonymous publisher). Each copy initialed by André Masson. Text by Jean-Louis Barrault, Georges Bataille, André Breton, Robert Desnos, Paul Éluard, Armel Guerne, Pierre Jean Jouve, Madeleine Landsberg, Michel Leiris, Georges Limbour, Benjamin Péret. Reprinted 1993 by Éditions André Dimanche, in Marseille.
 Dawn Ades. André Masson. Collection Les grands maîtres de l’art contemporain. Paris: Éditions Albin Michel, 1994. (Translated from the English by Jacques Tranier).
 André Breton. Le Surréalisme et la Peinture. Paris: Éditions Gallimard, 1965.
 Jean-Claude Clébert, Mythologie d'André Masson. Genève: Éditions Pierre Cailler, 1971.
 Daniel Guérin. Eux et Lui. suivi de commentaires, ornés de cinq dessins originaux d’André Masson. Lille: 2000.
 Armel Guerne. André Masson ou les autres valeurs.  2007.
 Hubert Juin. André Masson. Paris: Le musée de poche, 1963.
 Jean-Clarence Lambert. André Masson. Paris: Éditions Filipacchi, 1979.
 Françoise Levaillant. Massacre de signes. Tokyo: Misuzu Shobo, 1995.
 Georges Limbour et Michel Leiris André Masson et son univers. Lausanne: Les Trois collines, 1947.
 Georges Limbour André Masson, dessins. Collection "Plastique". Paris: Éditions Braun, 1951.
 André Masson. Entretiens avec Georges Charbonnier, préface de Georges Limbour. Paris: Julliard, 1958. Reprinted 1995 by éditions André Dimanche, Marseille.
 André Masson. La Mémoire du monde. Geneva: Skira, 1974 (conversations with Gaétan Picon).
 André Masson. Le Vagabond du surréalisme. (conversations with Gilbert Brownstone). Paris: Éditions Saint-Germain-des-Près, 1975.
 André Masson. Le Rebelle du Surréalisme. Paris: Éditions Hermann, 1976. (Anthologie établie par Françoise Levaillant). Reprinted 1994.
 André Masson. Les Années surréalistes. Correspondance 1916–1942. Lyon: La Manufacture, 1990. (édition établie et présentée par Françoise Levaillant, d’après le Doctorat de F. Levaillant, "André Masson: Lettres choisies 1922–1942". Université de Paris I, Panthéon-Sorbonne, 1986).
 André Masson. "Dissonances". In An Anthology from X. Oxford and New York: Oxford University Press, 1988. "X magazine", Vol. I, No. III (June 1960)
 Florence de Mèredieu. André Masson, les dessins automatiques.  Blusson, 1988.
 Stephan Moebius. Die Zauberlehrlinge. Soziologiegeschichte des Collège de Sociologie. Constance: , 2006.
 Bernard Noël. André Masson, la chair du regard. Collection l'art et l'écrivain. Paris: Gallimard, 1993.
 René Passeron. André Masson et les puissances de signe.  Denoël 1975.
 José Pierre," L’Aventure Surréaliste autour d’André Breton ", Paris, éd. Filipacchi, 1986.
 Clark V. Poling. André Masson and the Surrealist Self. New Haven and London: Yale University Press, 2008. 
 Michel Surya. Georges Bataille, la mort à l'œuvre. Paris: Gallimard, 1992. 
 Françoise Will-Levaillant. André Masson, période asiatique 1950–1959. Paris: Galerie de Seine, 1972.
Buchholz, Kai, and Klaus Wolbert (eds.). André Masson. Bilder aus dem Labyrinth der Seele. Frankfurt a. M.:  2003.
Kaiser-Strohmann, Dagmar. Vom Aufruhr zur Struktur. Schriftwerte im Informel, exhibition catalogue, : Gustav-Luebcke-Museum Hamm 2008. .
Mueller-Yao, Marguerite Hui. Der Einfluss der Kunst der chinesischen Kalligraphie auf die westliche informelle Malerei. PhD diss. Bonn, Koeln 1985. .
Mueller-Yao, Marguerite. "Informelle Malerei und chinesische Kalligrafie". In Informel, Begegnung und Wandel, edited by Heinz Althoefer, . Schriftenreihe des Museums am Ostwall 2. Dortmund: , 2002. .
Rolf Wedewer. Die Malerei des Informel. Weltverlust und Ich-Behauptung. Munich: Deutscher Kunstverlag, 2007. .
 Carmine Benincasa. André Masson – L’universo della pittura Milan: Editore Mondatori, 1989. 

 References 

External links
Masson at the Tate Gallery.
Short biography.
Müller-Yao, Marguerite: Informelle Malerei und chinesische Kalligrafie, Dortmund 2002 
 
 Interview with André Masson on Acéphale'' in Black Sun Lit (October 2016)

1896 births
1987 deaths
People from Oise
20th-century French painters
20th-century French male artists
French male painters
Modern painters
French surrealist artists
artists from Aix-en-Provence
People from New Preston, Connecticut